Jerome Suku Doe is a Liberian football player who plays as a centre forward for Laos Toyota. Jerome Suku Doe made name for himself during his playing term with El Seka El Hadid of Egypt and Anges De Notse of Togo.

Career
Jerome Suku Doe started playing football during his early age, he was one of the top scorers in the Monrovia Elementay football league. Jerome stylish football took him to one of Liberia's giant Monrovia Club Breweries FC in 2009 and he was signed for the 2010 season. He made fans of the club happy all the time with his scoring form.

The former Gardnersville FC and Monrovia Breweries midfielder converted striker helped the club as he led their attack in enabling them win the championship to the surprise of many.

The team achieved the feat after pinning Tchaoudjo FC 1-0 on Sunday November 10, with the sleek Liberian forward netting the only goal of the match to enable his side win the championship with 59 points from 30 games.

He have a short spell with Malaysian League team Sabah in 2014. He only made two appearances against Penang and Felda United.

MVP's
The attacker picked up four MVP's awards in the four countries he played, he appeared in AFC with Lao Toyota FC in 2015 after winning the Lao's premiership.

References

External
 liberiaentertainment.com
 
 libfootball.com
 

Liberian footballers
Sportspeople from Monrovia
Living people
1992 births
Sabah F.C. (Malaysia) players
Liberia international footballers
Association football forwards